The 1959 United Kingdom general election in Northern Ireland was held on 8 October with 12 MPs elected in single-seat constituencies using first-past-the-post as part of the wider general election in the United Kingdom.

The election took place towards the end of the IRA border campaign, which had seen the IRA launch a series of attacks and bombings against Northern Irish police and infrastructure. The launch of the campaign had in part been encouraged by the results of the last UK general election in Northern Ireland, which had seen Sinn Féin gain 2 seats, and receive nearly a quarter of the vote.

Results
The Ulster Unionists won all the seats in region. This was a net gain from the result at the previous election, although they held all seats in the region before the 1959 election was called: in Fermanagh and South Tyrone, Philip Clarke was unseated by petition and Robert Grosvenor was declared elected to the seat; in Mid Ulster, George Forrest had been elected in a by-election as an Independent Unionist, but subsequently joined the Ulster Unionists.

In the election as a whole, the Conservative Party, which included the Ulster Unionists, led by Harold Macmillan as Prime Minister, continued in a majority government.

MPs elected

Footnotes

References

Northern Ireland
1959
1959 elections in Northern Ireland
October 1959 events in the United Kingdom